Yunzhou or Yun Prefecture was a zhou (prefecture) in imperial China in modern southwestern Shandong, China. It existed (intermittently) from 590 to 1109.

Geography
During the Sui dynasty it was seated in modern Yuncheng County, but since 634 the seat was moved northeastwards to modern Dongping County.

In the Tang dynasty its administrative area probably includes of parts of modern:
 Under the administration of Heze
 Yuncheng County
 Juye County
 Under the administration of Jining
 Liangshan County
 Under the administration of Tai'an
 Dongping County
 Under the administration of Jinan
 Pingyin County
 Changqing District (Jinan)
 Under the administration of Liaocheng
 Yanggu County
 Dong'e County

References
 

Prefectures of the Sui dynasty
Prefectures of the Tang dynasty
Prefectures of Later Liang (Five Dynasties)
Prefectures of Later Tang
Prefectures of Later Jin (Five Dynasties)
Prefectures of Later Han (Five Dynasties)
Prefectures of Later Zhou
Prefectures of the Song dynasty
Former prefectures in Shandong